James Davison Heriot (November 2, 1890 – October 12, 1918) was a SC National Guard Soldier from the 118th Infantry Regiment, 30th Infantry Division, United States Army who received the Medal of Honor for his actions during World War I.

Biography
Heriot was born in Spring Hill, South Carolina on November 2, 1890, and died October 12, 1918, in Vaux-Andigny, France. He is buried in Rembert Methodist Church, Lee County, South Carolina.  His gravesite is located in the front row of the cemetery plot.

Medal of Honor citation
Rank and organization: Corporal, U.S. Army, Company I, 118th Infantry, 30th Division. Place and date: At Vaux-Andigny, France, October 12, 1918. Entered service at: Spring Hill, SC. Birth: Spring Hill, SC. G.O. No.: 13, W.D., 1919.

Citation:

Cpl. Heriot, with 4 other soldiers, organized a combat group and attacked an enemy machine-gun nest which had been inflicting heavy casualties on his company. In the advance 2 of his men were killed, and because of the heavy fire from all sides the remaining 2 sought shelter. Unmindful of the hazard attached to his mission, Cpl. Heriot, with fixed bayonet, alone charged the machinegun, making his way through the fire for a distance of 30 yards and forcing the enemy to surrender. During this exploit he received several wounds in the arm, and later in the same day, while charging another nest, he was killed.

See also

List of Medal of Honor recipients
List of Medal of Honor recipients for World War I

References

External links

 James D. Heriot's Medal of Honor. SCDL. Retrieved May 29, 2017.
 James D. Heriot's Medal of Honor certificate. SCDL. Retrieved May 29, 2017.

United States Army Medal of Honor recipients
United States Army non-commissioned officers
American military personnel killed in World War I
1890 births
1918 deaths
Military personnel from South Carolina
World War I recipients of the Medal of Honor